Perri 6 is a British social scientist. He changed his name from David Ashworth to Perri 6 in 1983.  Whilst not an academic at the time, many years later he said he was amused by the notion of "6, P" appearing in academic papers.

6 worked for Demos, a centre-left think tank with close ties to New Labour in the 1990s. Much of 6's recent research is based on the cultural theory of risk, which he refers to as "neo-Durkheimian institutional theory". He has also done government-backed research for the Information Commissioner's Office, and has written on behalf of the think-tank Demos. He has also written for the peer-reviewed Journal of Public Administration Research and Theory, Social Policy and Society and Public Administration.

6 is currently Chair in Public Management at Queen Mary University of London.

Honors and awards
 In 2013, he was elected as a fellow of the Academy of Social Sciences.

Selected bibliography 
 

  Perri 6, Charlotte Fletcher‐Morgan, and Kate Leyland. "Making people more responsible: the Blair Governments' Programme for changing Citizens' behaviour." Political studies 58.3 (2010): 427-449. abstract

References

External links
  at Queen Mary University of London

Year of birth missing (living people)
Living people
21st-century social scientists
Academics of Nottingham Trent University
Academics of Queen Mary University of London
British sociologists
Fellows of the Academy of Social Sciences
Place of birth missing (living people)